Who's Better, Who's Best: This Is The Very Best of The Who is a 1988 compilation album by The Who. A compilation of videos also titled Who's Better, Who's Best was released in 1988 as well.

Track listing
All tracks composed by Pete Townshend, except where noted.
"My Generation" – 3:16
"Anyway, Anyhow, Anywhere" (Townshend, Roger Daltrey) – 2:39
"The Kids Are Alright" – 2:45
"Substitute" – 3:46
"I'm a Boy" – 2:38
"Happy Jack" – 2:12
"Pictures of Lily" – 2:42
"I Can See for Miles" – 4:06
"Who Are You" (Single edit) – 5:03
"Won't Get Fooled Again" (Single edit) – 3:38
"Magic Bus" – 3:19
"I Can't Explain" – 2:04
"Pinball Wizard" – 2:59
"I'm Free" – 2:40
"See Me, Feel Me" – 3:30
"Squeeze Box" – 2:40
"Join Together" (Coda omitted) – 4:19
"You Better You Bet" – 5:37

The track listing refers to "Won't Get Fooled Again" as an "Extended Version". The track is in fact an edited version released as a single on the American release and the full version on the British release.

The track listing for the UK CD edition included unedited versions of "The Kids Are Alright" (3:05) and "Won't Get Fooled Again" (8:31). The front cover also differed, showing the band performing live in 1973.

"Baba O'Riley" is a bonus track on CD copies.

Personnel
 Roger Daltrey – Vocals
 Pete Townshend – Guitars, keyboards, vocals
 John Entwistle – Bass guitar. vocals
 Keith Moon – Drums
 Kenney Jones – Drums on 'You Better You Bet'

 Design
 Cover design, US and UK versions, by Richard Evans
 Cover photography by Ethan Russell
 Sleeve notes by Richard Barnes.

Chart performance

Certifications

References

1988 greatest hits albums
The Who compilation albums
Albums produced by Jon Astley
Albums produced by Kit Lambert
Albums produced by Shel Talmy
Albums produced by Bill Szymczyk
MCA Records compilation albums